Pierre-Antoine Dossevi (born 17 January 1952) is a Togolese former professional footballer who played as a right winger.

Career
Dossevi made appearances for Tours, Paris-Saint Germain, USL Dunkerque and Bourges.

After he retired from playing, Dossevi was a member of Tours' professional staff for nine years.

Personal life
Dossevi is the father of Thomas and Matthieu, professional footballers who have played internationally for Togo.

References

External links
 

1952 births
Living people
French sportspeople of Togolese descent
Sportspeople from Lomé
Association football wingers
Togolese footballers
French footballers
Tours FC players
Paris Saint-Germain F.C. players
Bourges 18 players
Ligue 1 players
Ligue 2 players
Dossevi family